Andrés Charadia Alfieri (born July 10, 1966) is a retired male hammer thrower from Argentina, who represented his native country three times in the men's hammer throw event at the Summer Olympics, starting in 1988. He set his personal best (74.66 metres) on October 9, 1994, at a meet in Cordoba, Argentina.

Achievements

References

 1991 Year Ranking
Profile

1966 births
Living people
Place of birth missing (living people)
Argentine male hammer throwers
Athletes (track and field) at the 1988 Summer Olympics
Athletes (track and field) at the 1992 Summer Olympics
Athletes (track and field) at the 1996 Summer Olympics
Olympic athletes of Argentina
Athletes (track and field) at the 1987 Pan American Games
Athletes (track and field) at the 1991 Pan American Games
Athletes (track and field) at the 1995 Pan American Games
Pan American Games silver medalists for Argentina
Pan American Games bronze medalists for Argentina
Pan American Games medalists in athletics (track and field)
South American Games gold medalists for Argentina
South American Games medalists in athletics
Competitors at the 1986 South American Games
Medalists at the 1987 Pan American Games
20th-century Argentine people